The Leica R8 & R9 are manual focus 35 mm single-lens reflex cameras produced by the German firm Leica as the final models of their R series.  Development of the R8 began in 1990:
the camera was introduced at the 1996 photokina trade show, and was succeeded by the similar Leica R9 in 2002.

Both can be fitted with the Digital Modul R (DMR) digital back (discontinued in 2007 ) and used as a digital camera making them the only 35 mm SLRs to take a user-installable digital back. The R8 was the first R-series camera to have no association with Minolta, being solely a Leica design and showing a clear stylistic change compared to prior bodies.

Design
Industrial designer Manfred Meinzer was chiefly responsible for the R8 design, along with a team of designers largely new to Leica or drawn from outside. The R8 was intended as a clean break from the previous generation of Leica R cameras, which had been developed in cooperation with Minolta. A key design goal was to evoke the Leica M and its smooth top plate; instead of a raised pentaprism as in previous R series cameras, the R8 has sloped "shoulders" that blend almost seamlessly into the pentaprism housing.  The shape is strongly asymmetrical, especially in plan view, with a bulged right handgrip and smaller, tapered left-hand side.

Another goal was to improve the ergonomics and to place controls so they could be easily reached and operated without removing the eye from the viewfinder. Although the R8 is capable of fully automated exposure and (with the addition of the integrally-styled motor drive or winder) automated film transport, the location of the shutter speed dial lends itself to manual exposure control, as many Leica customers preferred this. In this it differs strongly from other contemporary SLRs, which were designed primarily for automatic operation. The top control wheels are sunk into the top plate, with knurled edges protruding at the front where they can easily be operated by the photographer's fingertips.

The R8 is substantially larger and heavier than the R4-R7 series cameras, being about a third heavier at 890g than the R7. This is partly explained by being built to take and balance the heavier zoom lenses in the Leica R lens range. The styling of the R8 proved controversial, some photographers consider it ugly and dubbed it the "Hunchback of Solms" (Solms is the German town where Leica was headquartered; the company moved back to its original home town of Wetzlar in 2014). The size and bulk of the camera attracted much criticism although the R8/9 fitted with motor winder were almost exactly the same size and weight as the preceding R7 with motor winder.

Technical information
The R8 was without doubt the most complex camera Leica had ever constructed containing extensive electronics including a microprocessor, despite its manual operation bias, and in addition was built in a very modular fashion to integrate seamlessly with motor drive units and new backs such as the Digital Modul R.

Shutter 
The shutter used was a Copal vertically running metal-leaf unit capable of speeds between 1/8000 and 32 seconds steplessly in automatic modes, or to 16 seconds in half-stop steps in manual mode, as well as Bulb. The flash X-sync speed is 1/250 sec.

The shutter release is in the center of the shutter-speed dial and is threaded for a cable release. The optional Motor-Drive gives additional front and vertical-grip releases.

Metering 
The highly sophisticated metering system allows free choice of metering mode and exposure mode. By contrast, the earlier R4-R7 series lacked multi pattern metering and offered only pre-set combinations of metering and exposure.

Three metering modes are offered:
 Integrated centre weighted
 Selective
 Multi pattern (Matrix)

and five exposure modes:
 Manual
 Aperture priority semi automatic
 Shutter priority semi automatic
 Program fully automatic
 Flash pre exposure measurement

Mounted on the secondary mirror itself was a single cell for selective measurement and in the camera base was a five segment cell for integrated measurement with multi-pattern measurement. Using both provided six measurement areas. Switching of both metering mode and exposure mode was electronic. Flash pre-exposure measurement was provided allowing the camera's meter to measure manually controlled flash such as studio flash. Pre-flash measurement was always selective and in addition to automatic TTL flash measurement during exposure with suitable automatic flash units which was always full field using two small light cells either side of the main multi-pattern cell. Exposure compensation was available in all exposure modes.

Program mode can be biased towards longer or shorter shutter speeds by using the shutter speed dial. Also in program mode automatic flash exposure was fully controlled by the camera: off in daylight conditions, fill in flash with low light, full flash when dark. Normal flash synchronisation speed is 1/250s and with suitable flash units can be up to the camera's highest speed of 1/8000s.

The viewfinder display was digital LED visible in any lighting.

Lens mount changes 
The same bayonet and stepped cam of earlier R cameras was used, but additional electrical contacts called "ROM Contacts" were added to convey lens focal length setting. Any lens fitted with the R stepped cam may be used, but very early lenses fitted only with sloped cams (1 or 2 cam lenses) may damage the ROM contacts and should first be fitted with the stepped cam.

Lens / camera combinations are as follows:

Leica 1 cam, 2 cam, 3 cam, & R stepped cam lenses may be fitted with ROM contacts but as this entails removal of the original sloped cams they would then be incompatible with the original Leicaflex cameras. This was the first break in on-going compatibility of Leica reflex lenses.

R9 

The R9 was an evolutionary step from the R8 and appears superficially very similar; enough so that some have opined that it should have been simply a Mark II of the R8, or in Leica nomenclature, an "R8.2".[2]

The silver top-plate color available on the R8 was replaced by an 'Anthracite' color on the R9; black remained available. Another external change was the addition of an LCD frame counter on the top plate between the wind lever and the shutter-speed dial. The mode selector dial gained a lock, after many R8 user complaints that it was too easily moved from the desired setting when handling the camera. The rear LCD display gained a backlight so it could be viewed in dim lighting.

The mass of the R9 was reduced by 100g (to 790g) from the R8, achieved by switching to a magnesium casting for the top plate (formerly zinc alloy) and substituting aluminum for steel at the bottom plate's frame.

Electronic changes included the ability to tune the sensitivity of matrix metering in steps of 0.1 EV independently of the other metering modes, and several improvements to the flash support. Metz's HSS (High Speed Sync) flash mode was now supported, allowing fill flash at shutter speeds greater than the X-sync speed by the use of many repeated small flashes of the electronic flashgun. This mode could be used from 1/360 to the camera's shortest 1/8000 of a second shutter speed. Also improved was the use of fill-flash at slower shutter speeds and wider apertures, by enabling lower-power illumination modes on modern Metz equipment. The manual flash exposure compensation ability in Program mode was improved, and AE lock was now possible in all automated modes.

Accessories
Leica sell a number of dedicated accessories for the R8 and R9.  In addition to the Digital Modul R, these comprise the following:
 Motor-Winder R8/R9: gives powered film transport (loading/advance/rewind) and continuous 2 frame/s shooting.  It affixes to the camera's base, adding 20 mm in height, and replaces the right handgrip as well, this containing the two CR-123 lithium batteries it uses.  A switch enables leader-out rewinds.  An additional battery pack may be affixed to the base for extended use. This winder is much lighter and more compact than the previous version, the combination of R8 + Winder is almost exactly the same overall size and weight as the previous equivalent R7 + Winder
 Motor-Drive R8/R9: like the Motor-Winder, but larger and gives continuous 4.5 frame/s shooting in addition to single-shot and 2 frame/s.  It provides additional shutter releases ― on the handgrip and on the vertical grip on the base.  Enables three-shot auto-bracketing of exposure in 0.5 or 1 EV increments.
 Remote Control R8/R9: an electronic unit that attaches to either the Motor Winder or the Motor Drive; it cannot be connected to the bare camera.  In addition to triggering the shutter, the Remote Control can turn the camera on or off, control mode and exposure, control auto-bracketing, and can function as an intervalometer triggering at rates between one per second and one every 24 hours.  It comes with a 5-metre cord and can be fitted with up to 4 25 metre extension cords for a maximum length of 105 metres.
 Electric trigger switches: If the functionality of the Remote Control is not needed and all that is required is to trip the shutter, two electric trigger switches are available; one with a 5-metre cord that can also take extension cords, and one with a 0.3 metre cord for shake-free trigger release on a tripod.
 SF 24D flash: Leica's dedicated flash unit enables camera-controlled TTL flash output on the R8 and R9. Covers the field of view of 35–85 mm lenses (with diffusers, 24–135 mm.
 Focusing screens: the standard focusing screen, ground-glass with split-image and microprism collar, can be replaced by any of five other screens for specialised tasks.  For the Digital Modul R, an additional set of six screens marked with the Modul R's sensor crop area can be substituted.
 Other accessories from Leica include a rubber eyecup, right-angle finder, diopter correction lenses, cases, straps, tripods, cable releases etc.

End of the R series 
On Wednesday, 4 March 2009, Leica announced via the L-Newsletter that no further stock was available and production of the R series cameras and accessories had ended.[3]

Specifications

References

External links
 
 
 Thorsten Overgaard: Leica R8 and Leica R9 with Leica DMR digital back

3